The Features is the fourth studio album by American rock band The Features, which was released on May 14, 2013 on the label Bug Music/Serpents and Snakes.

Track listing
 "Rotten" – 3:50
 "Tenderly" – 2:44	
 "This Disorder" – 3:06
 "Won't Be Long" – 3:34
 "Fox on the Run" – 4:03
 "With Every Beat" – 4:35
 "Ain't No Wonder" – 4:10
 "The New Romantic" – 3:08
 "In Your Arms" – 3:08
 "Regarding PG" – 3:00
 "Phase Too" – 4:43

References

2013 albums
The Features albums